Fermanagh and Tyrone are two of the six counties comprising Northern Ireland.

County Fermanagh and County Tyrone were represented in the Northern Ireland House of Commons 1921–1973. This article deals with the Fermanagh and Tyrone County constituencies. See also the List of Northern Ireland Parliament constituencies 1921-1973.

Boundaries
1921-1929: County Fermanagh and County Tyrone were combined as an eight-member constituency, electing MPs using the single transferable vote method of proportional representation. There was a two-member UK Parliament constituency of Fermanagh and Tyrone, 1922–1950, with the same boundaries.

1929-1973: The area was divided into eight single member divisions, electing MPs using the first past the post electoral system. Three seats were in Fermanagh and five in Tyrone. From north to south the divisions were:-
 Tyrone North.
 Tyrone Mid.
 Tyrone East.
 Tyrone West.
 Fermanagh Enniskillen.
 Tyrone South.
 Fermanagh South.
 Fermanagh Lisnaskea.

Summary of Representation of Constituencies
Key to Parties: AP Anti-Partitionist, N Nationalist, SF Sinn Féin, U Ulster Unionist.

 1921-1925 U 4, SF 3, N 1 (1st Parliament)
 1925-1953 U 4, N 4 (2nd-7th Parliaments) 
 1953-1958 U 4, N 3, AP 1 (8th Parliament)
 1958-1962 U 5, N 3 (9th Parliament)
 1962-1973 U 4, N 4 (10th-12th Parliaments)

Members of Parliament
In this list the multi member constituency (1921–29) is referred to as FERMANAGH and TYRONE.

Dáil Éireann
In 1921 Sinn Féin decided to use the UK authorised elections for the Northern Ireland House of Commons and the House of Commons of Southern Ireland as a poll for the Irish Republic's Second Dáil. This area, in republican theory, was incorporated in a five-member Dáil constituency of Fermanagh and Tyrone.

Sources
 Northern Ireland Parliamentary Election Results 1921-1972, compiled and edited by Sydney Elliott (Political Reference Publications 1973)
For the exact definition of constituency boundaries see http://www.election.demon.co.uk/stormont/boundaries.html

Constituencies of the Northern Ireland Parliament
Historic constituencies in County Fermanagh
Historic constituencies in County Tyrone